Eric Freire Gomes (born 22 September 1972), known as Gaúcho, is a Brazilian retired footballer who played as a striker.

He amassed Primeira Liga totals of 278 matches and 103 goals during ten seasons, mainly at the service of Estrela da Amadora.

Football career
Born in Barreiros, Pernambuco, Gaúcho spent most of his career as a prolific goalscorer in Portugal, mainly with C.F. Estrela da Amadora for whom he played in five Primeira Liga seasons. In 1999–2000, his 21 league goals – third-best in the competition – propelled the Lisbon outskirts team to a final eighth place.

Gaúcho, who represented five other clubs in the country, also had brief spells in South Korea and Spain. In the 1998–99 campaign, loaned by Estrela, he only scored twice as CD Ourense suffered second level relegation; he played almost until his 40s, retiring after a stint in amateur football in his country.

References

External links

CBF data 

1972 births
Living people
Sportspeople from Pernambuco
Brazilian footballers
Association football forwards
Campeonato Brasileiro Série A players
Guarani FC players
Ferroviário Atlético Clube (CE) players
Sport Club do Recife players
Santa Cruz Futebol Clube players
Primeira Liga players
Liga Portugal 2 players
Segunda Divisão players
C.F. Estrela da Amadora players
C.S. Marítimo players
Rio Ave F.C. players
C.D. Feirense players
S.C. Beira-Mar players
Moreirense F.C. players
Segunda División players
CD Ourense footballers
K League 1 players
Busan IPark players
Brazilian expatriate footballers
Expatriate footballers in Portugal
Expatriate footballers in Spain
Expatriate footballers in South Korea
Brazilian expatriate sportspeople in Portugal